Nikolaus Kraft (14 December 1778, Eszterháza, Hungary – 18 May 1853, Cheb, Bohemia) was an Austrian cellist and composer (six cello concertos). He was the son of Antonín Kraft, under whom he first studied. He then trained under Jean-Louis Duport (1801). He claimed to have been the soloist for the premiere of Beethoven's Triple Concerto and played alongside Mozart and Anton Teyber on 12 April 1789 at Dresden on Mozart's Berlin journey.

External links 
 

1778 births
1853 deaths
18th-century Austrian people
19th-century Austrian people
18th-century Hungarian people
18th-century musicians
19th-century musicians
18th-century composers
19th-century composers
Austrian male composers
Austrian composers
Austrian classical cellists
Esterházy family
Austrian expatriates in Hungary
People from Győr-Moson-Sopron County
19th-century Czech male musicians